StoneRiver, Inc. is a vendor and service provider in the insurance technology marketplace, providing Life/Annuity, Property & Casualty (P&C)/Workers’ Compensation, reinsurance, financial and compliance software. The company is wholly owned by Sapiens International Corporation, (NASDAQ and TASE: SPNS), a provider of software for the insurance industry, with a growing presence in the financial services sector.

StoneRiver sells products for policy administration, claims, billing, reinsurance administration, agency management, client management, Life automated underwriting, e-applications, and illustrations. The company's financial and compliance offerings encompass software for annual statement preparation, general ledger, financial reporting and payments.  Headquartered in Denver, CO, StoneRiver has locations throughout U.S. including California, Colorado, Florida, and Ohio.

History
In 2017 Sapiens International Corporation acquired StoneRiver from Stone Point Capital and Fiserv. Prior to July 2008, the business units that comprise StoneRiver were part of Fiserv Incorporated, which was founded in 1984.

Corporate structure

StoneRiver, Inc

StoneRiver, Inc provides software products and services in the following areas:

 P&C Policy administration
 P&C Claim management
 P&C Reinsurance Administration
 Life insurance, Life annuity, and Long-term care policy administration
 Life, Annuity and Long-Term Care sales illustrations
 Life, Annuity and Long-Term care automated underwriting
 Financial & Compliance: annual statement preparation, general ledger, financial reporting and payments''

References

External links
 Novarica ACE Ranking
 Gartner Technology

Information technology companies of the United States
Companies based in California
American companies established in 2008
2008 establishments in California
Financial services companies established in 2008
2017 mergers and acquisitions